Jones Township may refer to the following townships in the United States:

 Jones Township, Elk County, Pennsylvania
 Jones Township, Beltrami County, Minnesota

See also 
 Madawaska Valley, Ontario, amalgamation of Sherwood, Jones and Burns Township with Radcliffe Township and Barry's Bay